Akiko can refer to:

 Akiko (comic book), an American comic book
 Akiko (film), a 1961 Italian comedy film
 Akiko (Amiga), a custom chip used in the Amiga CD32 games console
 Akiko (given name), a common Japanese female given name